Perceptual is the second studio album by Brian Blade Fellowship, released in 2000, on the Blue Note label.

Track listing
All tracks composed by Brian Blade; except where indicated

 "Perceptual" (Jon Cowherd) – 	6:28
 "Evinrude-Fifty (Trembling)" – 7:56
 "Reconciliation" (Cowherd) – 6:44
 "Crooked Creek" (Cowherd) – 9:10
 "Patron Saint of Girls" – 	2:40
 "The Sunday Boys (Improvisation)" (Cowherd, Myron Walden) – 1:06
 "Variations of A Bloodline" – 9:09
 "Steadfast" – 8:21
 "Trembling" – 2:17

Personnel

Brian Blade Fellowship 
Brian Blade – acoustic guitar, drums, vocals, producer, liner notes, art director
Melvin Butler – tenor and soprano saxophone
Jon Cowherd – producer, piano, pump organ, Fender Rhodes
Dave Easley – pedal steel guitar
Daniel Lanois – acoustic guitar, guitar, pedal steel guitar
Joni Mitchell – vocals ("Steadfast")
Kurt Rosenwinkel – acoustic guitar and electric guitar
Christopher Thomas – bass, backing vocal
Myron Walden – bass clarinet, alto saxophone

Production 
Greg Calbi  – Mastering Advisor
Edward Curtis  – Photography
Mantis Evar  – Product Manager
Deborah Feingold  – Photography
Joe Ferla  – Engineer, Mixing
Anthony Gorman  – Assistant Engineer
Mark Howard  – Engineer
Gordon Jee  – Director
Andrea Yankovsky  – Assistant Engineer

References

2000 albums
Brian Blade albums
Blue Note Records albums